Thomas or Tom Matthews may refer to:

Thomas Matthews (engineer) (1849–1930), British civil engineer
Tom Matthews (trade unionist) (1866-1915), British-born trade unionist active in the US and South Africa
Tom Matthews (politician) (1920/21–2002), British politician
Stanley Matthews (judge) (Thomas Stanley Matthews, 1824–1889), American judge
T. S. Matthews (Thomas Stanley Matthews, 1901–1991), American editor for Time magazine, grandson of Stanley
Thomas A. Matthews, American astronomer
Thomas Matthews (English cricketer) (1845–1932), English cricketer
Thomas Matthews (Australian cricketer) (1905–1990), Australian cricketer
Thomas Matthews (cyclist) (1884–1969), British cyclist
Thomas Matthews (table tennis) (born 1992), British Paralympic table tennis player
Thomas Matthews (colonel), United States Army colonel

Fictional
Thomas Matthews (Dexter), a character in the American television drama series Dexter

See also
Thomas Mathews (1676–1751), British Royal Navy admiral
Thomas Mathews (politician) (1742–1812), American Revolutionary War general and Virginia politician